"Tomorrow (Is Another Day)" (also known simply as "Tomorrow") is a dance song by Canadian musician Marc Mysterio and British singer Samantha Fox recorded and released in 2009.

"Tomorrow" was issued in three single formats, containing numerous remixes.

The song was later included on Samantha's retrospective album, Greatest Hits, released in December 2009.

A brand new remix of Tomorrow Is Another Day was released on August 19,2022 on Spotify. 2022 Spotify Release of new remix. 

The new release marks the first time any version of the track had ever been made available on streaming services.

References

2009 singles
Samantha Fox songs
2009 songs
Song articles with missing songwriters